Mannenji temple is a  temple dedicated to the Jodo sect of Buddhism. It is located in the town of Iwamizawa, Japan. It is known to house the haunted doll Okiku. There are many versions of how the doll arrived at the temple. But, all involve a girl dying and then a family leaves the doll at temple.

Etymology 

References 

Temples in Japan
Reportedly haunted locations in Japan